Hobgoblins 2 is a 2009 direct-to-DVD sequel to the 1988 science-fiction film, Hobgoblins.   Written and directed by Rick Sloane, the film was released on DVD by Shout! Factory on June 23, 2009. The sequel was made to look identical to the original film, and utilized 35mm film and composite effects, look-alike actors, some of the original costumes and the same puppets.

Plot
The film takes place after the original film, where McCreedy has been locked in a psychiatric hospital after blowing up the film studio to destroy the Hobgoblins, which occurred at the end of the first film.  Kevin and his friends are now in college, and their Professor introduces them to McCreedy, who warns them that it is still possible to be attacked by Hobgoblins.  Despite McCreedy's warning, Kevin and his friends re-encounter the Hobgoblins and must fight against them and their own greatest fears, in order to save their lives.

Cast

Development
Made on a minuscule budget, the film is full of in-jokes and low-budget special effects, just like the original. The characters still dress like in the 1980s. Fantazia now does Internet sex, instead of phone sex with Kyle, Nick has been dishonorably discharged from the United States Army, Daphne is still promiscuous, and Kevin is still henpecked by his frigid girlfriend Amy. Hobgoblins 2 also delivers even more stock shots of explosions and car crashes than the original.

A DVD bonus feature, "Hobgoblins 2, What Were They Thinking?", features the original Hobgoblins cast critiquing the new actors who re-created their roles.  Director Rick Sloane discusses how this film was originally planned to go into production two years after the original, and instead, 20 years later, it was shot using the same script.  Nonetheless, the film does include occasional sly references to the Mystery Science Theater 3000 episode, in which the original film was spoofed (after it was submitted to the MST3K team by Sloane himself) – in particular, the theme song for Hobgoblins 2 is based on a song that Mike and the Bots sing in the MST3K episode.

References

External links

 
 

2009 films
2009 direct-to-video films
2009 horror films
2009 independent films
2009 science fiction films
American science fiction horror films
American independent films
American sequel films
Direct-to-video horror films
Direct-to-video science fiction films
Direct-to-video sequel films
Films about legendary creatures
Films directed by Rick Sloane
Puppet films
2000s English-language films
2000s American films